A water tower is an elevated structure  supporting a water tank constructed at a height sufficient to pressurize a distribution system for potable water, and to provide emergency storage for fire protection. Water towers often operate in conjunction with underground or surface service reservoirs, which store treated water close to where it will be used. Other types of water towers may only store raw (non-potable) water for fire protection or industrial purposes, and may not necessarily be connected to a public water supply.

Water towers are able to supply water even during power outages, because they rely on hydrostatic pressure produced by elevation of water (due to gravity) to push the water into domestic and industrial water distribution systems; however, they cannot supply the water for a long time without power, because a pump is typically required to refill the tower. A water tower also serves as a reservoir to help with water needs during peak usage times. The water level in the tower typically falls during the peak usage hours of the day, and then a pump fills it back up during the night. This process also keeps the water from freezing in cold weather, since the tower is constantly being drained and refilled.

History 

Although the use of elevated water storage tanks has existed since ancient times in various forms, the modern use of water towers for pressurized public water systems developed during the mid-19th century, as steam-pumping became more common, and better pipes that could handle higher pressures were developed. In the United Kingdom, standpipes consisted of tall, exposed, N-shaped pipes, used for pressure relief and to provide a fixed elevation for steam-driven pumping engines which tended to produce a pulsing flow, while the pressurized water distribution system required constant pressure. Standpipes also provided a convenient fixed location to measure flow rates. Designers typically enclosed the riser pipes in decorative masonry or wooden structures. By the late 19th century, standpipes grew to include storage tanks to meet the ever-increasing demands of growing cities.

Many early water towers are now considered historically significant and have been included in various heritage listings around the world. Some are converted to apartments or exclusive penthouses. In certain areas, such as New York City in the United States, smaller water towers are constructed for individual buildings. In California and some other states, domestic water towers enclosed by siding (tankhouses) were once built (1850s–1930s) to supply individual homes; windmills pumped water from hand-dug wells up into the tank in New York.

Water towers were used to supply water stops for steam locomotives on railroad lines. Early steam locomotives required water stops every .

Design and construction 

A variety of materials can be used to construct a typical water tower; steel and reinforced or prestressed concrete are most often used (with wood, fiberglass, or brick also in use), incorporating an interior coating to protect the water from any effects from the lining material.

The height of the tower provides the pressure for the water supply system, and it may be supplemented with a pump. The volume of the reservoir and diameter of the piping provide and sustain flow rate. However, relying on a pump to provide pressure is expensive; to keep up with varying demand, the pump would have to be sized to meet peak demands. During periods of low demand, jockey pumps are used to meet these lower water flow requirements. The water tower reduces the need for electrical consumption of cycling pumps and thus the need for an expensive pump control system, as this system would have to be sized sufficiently to give the same pressure at high flow rates.

Very high volumes and flow rates are needed when fighting fires. With a water tower present, pumps can be sized for average demand, not peak demand; the water tower can provide water pressure during the day and pumps will refill the water tower when demands are lower.

Using wireless sensor networks to monitor water levels inside the tower allows municipalities to automatically monitor and control pumps without installing and maintaining expensive data cables.

Architecture 

The adjacent image shows three architectural approaches to incorporating these tanks in the design of a building, one on East 57th Street in New York City. From left to right, a fully enclosed and ornately decorated brick structure, a simple unadorned roofless brick structure hiding most of the tank but revealing the top of the tank, and a simple utilitarian structure that makes no effort to hide the tanks or otherwise incorporate them into the design of the building.

The technology dates to at least the 19th century, and for a long time New York City required that all buildings higher than six stories be equipped with a rooftop water tower. Two companies in New York build water towers, both of which are family businesses in operation since the 19th century.

The original water tower builders were barrel makers who expanded their craft to meet a modern need as buildings in the city grew taller in height. Even today, no sealant is used to hold the water in. The wooden walls of the water tower are held together with steel cables or straps, but water leaks through the gaps when first filled. As the water saturates the wood, it swells, the gaps close and become impermeable. The rooftop water towers store  of water until it is needed in the building below. The upper portion of water is skimmed off the top for everyday use while the water in the bottom of the tower is held in reserve to fight fire. When the water drops below a certain level, a pressure switch, level switch or float valve will activate a pump or open a public water line to refill the water tower.

Architects and builders have taken varied approaches to incorporating water towers into the design of their buildings. On many large commercial buildings, water towers are completely hidden behind an extension of the facade of the building. For cosmetic reasons, apartment buildings often enclose their tanks in rooftop structures, either simple unadorned rooftop boxes, or ornately decorated structures intended to enhance the visual appeal of the building. Many buildings, however, leave their water towers in plain view atop utilitarian framework structures.

Water towers are common in India, where the electricity supply is erratic in most places.

If the pumps fail (such as during a power outage), then water pressure will be lost, causing potential public health concerns. Many U.S. states require a "boil-water advisory" to be issued if water pressure drops below . This advisory presumes that the lower pressure might allow pathogens to enter the system.

Some have been converted to serve modern purposes, as for example, the Wieża Ciśnień (Wrocław water tower) in Wrocław, Poland which is today a restaurant complex. Others have been converted to residential use.

Historically, railroads that used steam locomotives required a means of replenishing the locomotive's tenders. Water towers were common along the railroad. The tenders were usually replenished by water cranes, which were fed by a water tower.

Some water towers are also used as observation towers, and some restaurants, such as the Goldbergturm in Sindelfingen, Germany, or the second of the three Kuwait Towers, in the State of Kuwait. It is also common to use water towers as the location of transmission mechanisms in the UHF range with small power, for instance for closed rural broadcasting service, amateur radio, or cellular telephone service.

In hilly regions, local topography can be substituted for structures to elevate the tanks. These tanks are often nothing more than concrete cisterns terraced into the sides of local hills or mountains, but function identically to the traditional water tower. The tops of these tanks can be landscaped or used as park space, if desired.

Spheres and spheroids 
The Chicago Bridge and Iron Company has built many of the water spheres and spheroids found in the United States. The website World's Tallest Water Sphere describes the distinction between a water sphere and water spheroid thus:
 

The Union Watersphere is a water tower topped with a sphere-shaped water tank in Union, New Jersey, and characterized as the World's Tallest Water Sphere.

However, photographs of the Erwin water tower revealed the new tower to be a water spheroid.

Slightly taller than the Union Watersphere, it is also a spheroid.

The name is taken from it being painted to resemble a globe of the world.

The Watertoren (or Water Towers) in Eindhoven, Netherlands contain three spherical tanks, each  in diameter and capable of holding  of water, on three  spires were completed in 1970.

Decoration 

Water towers can be surrounded by ornate coverings including fancy brickwork, a large ivy-covered trellis or they can be simply painted. Some city water towers have the name of the city painted in large letters on the roof, as a navigational aid to aviators and motorists. Sometimes the decoration can be humorous. An example of this are water towers built side by side, labeled HOT and COLD. Cities in the United States possessing side-by-side water towers labeled HOT and COLD include Granger, Iowa; Canton, Kansas; Pratt, Kansas, and St. Clair, Missouri; Eveleth, Minnesota at one time had two such towers, but no longer does.

Many small towns in the United States use their water towers to advertise local tourism, their local high school sports teams, or other locally notable facts. A "mushroom" water tower was built in Örebro, Sweden and holds almost two million gallons of water.

Tallest

Alternatives 
Alternatives to water towers are simple pumps mounted on top of the water pipes to increase the water pressure. This new approach is more straightforward, but also more subject to potential public health risks; if the pumps fail, then loss of water pressure may result in entry of contaminants into the water system. Most large water utilities do not use this approach, given the potential risks.

Examples

Australia 

 Bankstown Reservoir, Sydney

Austria 
 Wasserturm Amstetten
  (Water tower with transmission antenna)

Belgium 
 Mechelen-Zuid Watertoren

Brazil 
 Nave Espacial de Varginha in Varginha

Canada 
 Guaranteed Pure Milk bottle in Montreal, Quebec

Croatia 
 Vukovar water tower in Vukovar.

Denmark 
 Svaneke water tower

Germany 

 Lüneburg Water Tower
 Heidelberg TV Tower (TV tower with water reservoir)
 Mannheim Water Tower (built 1886–1889)

Kuwait 
Kuwait Towers, which include two water reservoirs, and Kuwait Water Towers (Mushroom towers in Kuwait City.

India 
 Tala tank in Kolkata

Italy 

Netherlands 
 Amsterdamsestraatweg Water Tower in Utrecht
 Eindhoven Water Towers in Eindhoven
 Poldertoren in Emmeloord
 Water Tower Simpelveld in Simpelveld
 Water Tower Hellevoetsluis in Hellevoetsluis

Poland 
 Wrocław Water Tower

Romania
Fabric Water Tower
Iosefin Water Tower
Oltenița Water Tower
Turnu Măgurele Water Tower

Slovakia 

 Water Tower in Komárno
 Water Tower in Trnava

Slovenia 
 Brežice Water Tower in Brežice

Sweden 
 Vanadislundens water reservoir (Stockholm)

United Kingdom 
 Cardiff Central Station Water Tower
 Dock Tower in Grimsby
 House in the Clouds in Thorpeness, Suffolk
 Jumbo in Colchester, Essex
 Norton Water Tower in Norton, Cheshire
 Tilehurst Water Tower in Reading
 Tower Park in Poole, Dorset
 Cranhill, Garthamlock and Drumchapel in Glasgow, and Tannochside just outside the city

United States 

 Brooks Catsup Bottle Water Tower near Collinsville, Illinois
 Chicago Water Tower in Chicago, Illinois
 Florence Y'all Water Tower in Florence, Kentucky
 Lawson Tower in Scituate, Massachusetts
 Leaning Water Tower in Groom, Texas
 North Point Water Tower in Milwaukee, Wisconsin
 Peachoid next to I-85 on the edge of Gaffney, South Carolina
 Show Place Arena water tower in Upper Marlboro, Maryland
 Union Watersphere in Union Township, New Jersey
 Volunteer Park Water Tower in Capitol Hill, Seattle, Washington
 Warner Bros. Water Tower in Burbank, California (In the animated TV series Animaniacs, it was used to incarcerate the characters Yakko, Wakko, and Dot, as well as to serve as their home.)
 Weehawken Water Tower in Weehawken, New Jersey
 Ypsilanti Water Tower in Ypsilanti, Michigan (Winner of the Most Phallic Building contest in 2003)

Standpipe 
A standpipe is a water tower which is cylindrical (or nearly cylindrical) throughout its whole height, rather than an elevated tank on supports with a narrower pipe leading to and from the ground. 
There were originally over 400 standpipe water towers in the United States, but very few remain today, including:

 Belton Standpipe in Belton, South Carolina (also in Allendale and Walterboro)
Belton Standpipe in Belton, Texas
 Bellevue Standpipe (actually a water tank, not a tower), in Boston, Massachusetts
 Chicago Water Tower, in Chicago, Illinois 
 Cochituate standpipe, in Boston, Massachusetts
 Craig, Nebraska standpipe
 Eden Park Stand Pipe, in Cincinnati
 Evansville Standpipe (a steel tower), in Evansville, Wisconsin
 Fall River Waterworks, in Fall River, Massachusetts
 Forbes Hill Standpipe, in Quincy, Massachusetts
 Louisville Water Tower, in Louisville, Kentucky
 North Point Water Tower, in Milwaukee, Wisconsin
 Reading Standpipe (demolished in 1999 and replaced by a modern steel tower), in Reading, Massachusetts
 St. Louis, Missouri has three standpipe water towers which are on the National Register of Historic Places.
 Bissell Tower (also known as the Red Tower)
 Compton Hill Tower
 Grand Avenue Water Tower
 Thomas Hill Standpipe, in Bangor, Maine
 Ypsilanti Water Tower, in Ypsilanti, Michigan
 Bremen Water Tower, in Bremen, Indiana

Gallery

See also 

 Architectural structure
 List of nonbuilding structure types
 American and Canadian Water Landmark
 Caldwell Tanks
 Gas holder, a similar utility storage structure
 Hyperboloid structure
 Pittsburgh-Des Moines Steel Co.
 Pumped-storage hydroelectricity
 Water tank

References

External links 

 International Watertower Archive
 Website about 1000 watertowers from Poland

 
Towers